Juan José Mina González (born 27 July 2004) is a Colombian footballer who currently plays as a right-back for Deportivo Cali.

Club career
Born in Guachené, Mina started his career with amateur sides Club Raíces, where he spent nearly seven years, and Villa Norte de Popayán, before trialling and signing with Deportivo Cali. He made his professional debut for the club on 7 May 2022, in a 1–1 Categoría Primera A draw with Santa Fe, getting the assist for Daniel Luna's goal.

International career
Mina has represented Colombia at under-15, under-16 and under-20 level. He was called up to the under-20 side for the 2023 South American U-20 Championship.

Personal life
Mina is the brother of fellow professional footballer, and Colombian international, Yerry Mina.

Career statistics

Club

Notes

References

2004 births
Living people
Sportspeople from Cauca Department
Colombian footballers
Colombia youth international footballers
Association football defenders
Categoría Primera A players
Deportivo Cali footballers